Juan Pablo Villalobos (born 1973) is a Mexican author. 

His debut novel, Down the Rabbit Hole, was published by And Other Stories in 2011 and was shortlisted for the Guardian First Book Award 2011. He is also the author of Quesadillas (2011) and I’ll Sell You a Dog (2016).

His fourth novel, I Don’t Expect Anyone to Believe Me, won the Herralde Prize.

He has lived in Mexico and Brazil, and currently resides in Spain with his wife and two children.

Life
Villalobos was born in Guadalajara, Mexico, in 1973. He lived in Barcelona, Spain, for eight years, before moving to Brazil. In 2014, he moved back to Barcelona.

He studied marketing and Spanish literature. He has worked in market research and published travel stories, as well as literary and film criticism.

Work

Villalobos's first book, Fiesta en la madriguera, has been translated into Portuguese, French, Italian, German, Romanian, Dutch and English. Its English translation, Down the Rabbit Hole by Rosalind Harvey, was published in September 2011 by the UK publishing house And Other Stories.  Down the Rabbit Hole was shortlisted for the 2011 Guardian First Book Award. 

His second novel, Quesadillas, was also translated by Rosalind Harvey and was published by And Other Stories in 2013.

His third novel, I’ll Sell You a Dog, was published by And Other Stories in 2016.

His fourth novel, I Don't Expect Anyone to Believe Me, was published by And Other Stories in the United Kingdom on 30 April 2020, and in the United States on 5 May 2020.

Influences
Villalobos has said that his first book was inspired by Nellie Campobello's Cartucho, a collection of short stories set during the Mexican Revolution.

Reviews
In Germany, Villalobos is recognized as an important representative of the so-called "narco-literature." His book Fiesta en la madriguera has been called "a disillusioned domestic tale from the dark heartland of Latin American machismo".

Bibliography
Novels
 Fiesta en la madriguera. Barcelona: Anagrama, 2011. 
 Down the Rabbit Hole trans. Rosalind Harvey. London: And Other Stories, 2011. 
Si viviéramos en un lugar normal, Barcelona: Anagrama, 2012. 
 Quesadillas trans. Rosalind Harvey. London: And Other Stories, 2013. 
 Te vendo un perro. Barcelona: Anagrama, 2015. 
 I'll Sell You a Dog trans. Rosalind Harvey. London: And Other Stories, 2016.  
 No voy a pedirle a nadie que me crea, Barcelona: Anagrama, 2017. Winner of the 2016 Premio Herralde.  
 I Don't Expect Anyone to Believe Me, trans. Daniel Hahn. Sheffield: And Other Stories, 2020  
 Yo tuve un sueño: El viaje de los niños centroamericanos a Estados Unidos. Barcelona: Anagrama, 2019.  
 The Other Side, trans. Rosalind Harvey. New York. Farrar, Straus and Giroux, 2019.  
 La invasion del pueblo del espíritu. Barcelona: Anagrama, 2020.  
 Invasion of the Spirit People, trans. Rosalind Harvey. London. And Other Stories, forthcoming 2022.

References

External links
Juan Pablo Villalobos (Editorial Anagrama author page)

1973 births
Living people
People from Guadalajara, Jalisco
Mexican male writers
21st-century Mexican writers
Mexican translators
Portuguese–Spanish translators